Men's 50 metre rifle prone (then known as small-bore free rifle) was one of the thirteen shooting events at the 1988 Summer Olympics. It was the first Olympic three positions competition to feature final shooting. Miroslav Varga equalled the world record with a perfect 600 in the qualification round, and retained half of his two-point pre-final lead until the end of the competition.

Qualification round

EWR Equalled world record – OR Olympic record – Q Qualified for final

Final

OR Olympic record

References

Sources

Shooting at the 1988 Summer Olympics
Men's 050m prone 1988
Men's events at the 1988 Summer Olympics